Todmorden is a market town and civil parish in the metropolitan borough of Calderdale, West Yorkshire, England.   It contains over 300 listed buildings that are recorded in the National Heritage List for England.  Of these, two are listed at Grade I, the highest of the three grades, eleven are at Grade II*, the middle grade, and the others are at Grade II, the lowest grade.  This list contains the listed buildings in the more outlying areas of the parish, namely those along Rochdale Road to the south of its junction with Bacup Road, including the settlement of Walsden and Warland, along Bacup Road, including Clough Foot, and the surrounding outlying rural and moorland areas, including the settlements of Mankinholes and Lumbutts.  The listed buildings in the inner area are in Listed buildings in Todmorden (inner area).

A high proportion of the listed buildings in these areas are farmhouses, farm buildings, houses and cottages, and laithe houses.  The Rochdale Canal runs through the areas, and the listed buildings associated with it are bridges and locks.  The other listed buildings include an inscribed stone and a standing stone, milestones and boundary stones, a former packhorse bridge, a grindstone and grindstone circle, a water trough, a monument, a road bridge, a former toll house, a former watermill, a church, a chapel and a church tower, a water tower, a former textile mill, and a school.


Key

Buildings

References

Citations

Sources

Lists of listed buildings in West Yorkshire
listed